The Palaung (Thai: ปะหล่อง, also written as Benglong Palong) or Ta'ang are a Mon–Khmer ethnic minority found in Shan State of Burma, Yunnan Province of China and Northern Thailand. In China, they are referred to as the De'ang ( also spelt Deang) people.

They live mainly in the northern parts of Shan State in the Pa Laung Self-Administered Zone, with the capital at Namhsan.

The Ta'ang (Palaung) State Liberation Army, the armed wing of the Palaung ethnic group, began fighting against the Burmese military in 1963. It entered a cease-fire agreement with the central government in April 1991, but is currently continuing the insurgency. Both the government and the rebel armies have derived benefit from poppy cultivation, which has caused serious drug addiction among the local people.

Groups

There are three main subgroups of Palaung: the Palé, Shwe and Rumai.

The Chinese government groups together the Palé, Riang, Rumai and Shwe peoples as the De'ang ethnic nationality. The group also includes the Danau (Danaw) who may no longer have a separate identity from the Palé.

Language

There are three main principal Palaung languages:  Palé (Ruching), Rumai, and Shwe (Ta'ang or De'ang).

Distribution
In China, the De'ang are found in the following villages of  Zhenkang County and Gengma County. In China, they are known as the Laopulao (牢普劳); there are six other De'ang groups located in Burma.

Dazhai Township (大寨乡), Muchang District (木厂区), Zhenkang County: Bangwa (邦娃) Dazhai (大寨), Xiazhai (下寨), Huoshishan (火石山), Laobandeng (老班登), Mahuangqing (蚂蟥箐) of Chaikao (柴考)
Nansan Township (南伞乡), Pengmushan District (彭木山区), Zhenkang County: Xiaochanggou (销长沟), Beiyan (北岩)
Hongmulin (红木林) and Manxing (曼兴) of Hewai District (河外区), Gengma County: Junnong (君弄), Mamao (马冒), Jinmo (金莫), Muyin (木因), Xungang (巡岗)

Religion
Most Ta'ang are adherents of Theravada Buddhism and Buddhist temples can be found in most of their towns. Buddhism is present in all of the daily activities of this ethnic group. At the age of ten, many children are sent to the monasteries, primarily for education. Most of them return to lay life in later years.

The Riang are the only one of the four groups who have never converted to Buddhism. The majority of the Riang are animists.

See also
Palaung language
Ta'ang National Liberation Army

Further reading
Palaung Women's Organisation. (2006). Poisoned Flowers: The Impacts of Spiralling Drug Addiction on Palaung Women in Burma. Tak, Maesot, Thailand: Palaung Women's Organisation.
Ashley, S. (2006). Exorcising with Buddha Palaung Buddhism in Northern Thailand. Ottawa: Library and Archives Canada = Bibliothèque et Archives Canada. 
Howard, M. C., & Wattana Wattanapun. (2001). The Palaung in Northern Thailand. Chiang Mai, Thailand: Silkworm Books. 
Cameron, A. A. (1912). Notes on the Palaung of the Kodaung Hill Tracts of Mong Mit State. Rangoon: Govt. Printer.
Milne, Mrs. Leslie. (1924). The Home of an Eastern Clan: A Study of the Palaungs of the Shan State. Oxford: Clarendon Press.

Gallery

References

External links

Ta'ang Students and Youth Organization

 
Ethnic groups officially recognized by China